The 1980 European Cup final was a football match held at the Santiago Bernabéu Stadium in Madrid, Spain on 28 May 1980, to determine the winner of the 1979–80 European Cup. The final saw defending champions Nottingham Forest of England defeat Hamburg of West Germany by a score of 1–0. In the 21st minute, John Robertson squeezed a shot past Hamburg keeper Rudi Kargus for the only goal of the game, and Forest then defended solidly, to give Nottingham Forest back-to-back European Cup titles.

Route to the final

Match

Details

See also
1979–80 European Cup
Nottingham Forest F.C. in European football

Notes

References

External links
1979–80 season at UEFA website

1980
Nottingham Forest F.C. matches
Hamburger SV matches
1
1980 European Cup Final
1979–80 in German football
1979–80 in English football
Football in Madrid
1980s in Madrid
May 1980 sports events in Europe
Sports competitions in Madrid